Viskuli is a hunting estate in Belavezhskaya Pushcha, in Pruzhany Raion, Brest Voblast, Belarus, named after the former khutor Viskuli nearby, about 8 km from the Poland-Belarus border, 2 km south of Belarus Route P81.

History
The residential complex was constructed in the 1950s as a state dacha for officials of the USSR and Byelorussian SSR.

In 1991, Viskuli became known worldwide as the place where the Belavezha Accords were signed, which declared the dissolution of the Soviet Union.

On September 12, 2008, Viskuli was the place of the meeting of the Foreign Ministers of Belarus (Sergei Martynov) and Poland (Radosław Sikorski), after several years of cold relations.

References

Populated places in Brest Region
Buildings and structures in Brest Region
Białowieża Forest